The Presbyterian Church in Korea (JeongTongGyeSeung) is a Reformed and Presbyterian denomination in South Korea. It subscribes the Apostles Creed and Westminster Confession. In 2004, it had 1,200 members and 56 congregations with 35 ordained members.

References 

Presbyterian denominations in South Korea
Presbyterian denominations in Asia